Hunger is a novel by the Norwegian author Knut Hamsun published in 1890 by P.G. Philipsens Forlag. The novel has been hailed as the literary opening of the 20th century and an outstanding example of modern, psychology-driven literature. Hunger portrays the irrationality of the human mind in an intriguing and sometimes humorous manner.

Description
Written after Hamsun's return from an ill-fated tour of America, Hunger is loosely based on the author's own impoverished life before his breakthrough in 1890. Set in late 19th-century Kristiania (now Oslo), the novel recounts the adventures of a starving young man whose sense of reality is giving way to a delusionary existence on the darker side of a modern metropolis. While he vainly tries to maintain an outer shell of respectability, his mental and physical decay are recounted in detail. His ordeal, enhanced by his inability or unwillingness to pursue a professional career, which he deems unfit for someone of his abilities, is pictured in a series of encounters which Hamsun himself described as "a series of analyses".

In many ways, the protagonist of the novel displays traits reminiscent of Raskolnikov in Crime and Punishment; the author, Fyodor Dostoevsky, being one of Hamsun's main influences.  The influence of naturalist authors such as Émile Zola is apparent in the novel, as is his rejection of the realist tradition.

Hunger encompasses two of Hamsun's literary and ideological leitmotifs:
 His insistence that the intricacies of the human mind ought to be the main object of modern literature: Hamsun's own literary program, to describe "the whisper of the blood and the pleading of the bone marrow", is thoroughly manifest in Hunger.
His depreciation of modern, urban civilization: In the opening lines of the novel, he ambivalently describes Kristiania as "this wondrous city that no one leaves before it has made its marks upon him." The latter is counterbalanced in other Hamsun works, such as Mysteries (Mysterier, 1892) and Growth of the Soil (Markens Grøde, 1920), which earned him the Nobel prize in literature but also brought about claims of his being a proto-National Socialist Blut und Boden author.

Plot summary
The novel's first-person protagonist, an unnamed vagrant with intellectual leanings, probably in his late twenties, wanders the streets of Norway's capital, Kristiania (Oslo), in pursuit of nourishment. Over four episodes he meets a number of more or less mysterious persons, the most notable being Ylajali, a young woman with whom he engages in a mild degree of physical intimacy.

He exhibits a self-created code of chivalry, giving money and clothes to needy children and vagrants, not eating food given to him, and turning himself in for stealing. Essentially self-destructive, he thus falls into traps of his own making, and with a lack of food, warmth and basic comfort, his body turns slowly to ruin. Overwhelmed by hunger, he scrounges for meals, at one point nearly eating his own (rather precious) pencil and his finger. His social, physical and mental states are in constant decline. However, he has no antagonistic feelings towards 'society' as such, rather he blames his fate on 'God' or a divine world order. He vows not to succumb to this order and remains 'a foreigner in life', haunted by 'nervousness, by irrational details'.

He experiences an artistic and financial triumph when he sells a text to a newspaper, but despite this he finds writing increasingly difficult. At one point in the story, he asks to spend a night in a prison cell, posing as a well-to-do journalist who has lost the keys to his apartment. In the morning he cannot bring himself to reveal his poverty or even partake in the free breakfast provided to the homeless. Finally, as the book comes to a close, when his existence is at an absolute ebb, he signs on to the crew of a ship leaving the city.

Publication history 
An extract from Hunger was first published anonymously in the Danish magazine Ny Jord in November 1888. After its full publication in 1890, Hamsun made revisions to the novel's text in subsequent editions in 1899, 1907 and 1916.

Translations into English

Hunger was first translated into English in 1899 by the writer and feminist George Egerton. Sverre Lyngstad incorrectly claimed that her translation was bowdlerized, in relation to the narrator's wandering sexual thoughts and actions. Instead, it was the widely available sixth (May 1921) and later Knopf printings of her translation that were censored, resulting in 263 instead of 266 pages. Stefano Evangelista notes that the Egerton translation "has withstood the passage of time very well" and Tore Rem notes that it is "arguably more radical than Lyngstad's translation".

A translation by Robert Bly was published in 1967. Lyngstad stated that Bly missed the mixing of the present and past tenses of the original, suggestive of a febrile mind, instead using a uniform past tense. He also noted that Bly's translation confused Oslo's streets and places.

The most recent translation, by Sverre Lyngstad in 1996, is considered by many to be definitive.

Adaptations

Hunger has been adapted into the following films:
 Hunger (1966), a Danish-Norwegian-Swedish film
 Hunger (2001), an American film
 Boy Eating the Bird's Food (2012), a Greek film, loosely based on Hunger
A graphic novel adaption of Hunger by Martin Erntzen was released in 2019.

References

Further reading
Humpal, Martin. The Roots of Modernist Narrative: Knut Hamsun's Novels Hunger, Mysteries and Pan International Specialized Book Services. 1999

External links
Hunger at Internet Archive

1890 Norwegian novels
Novels by Knut Hamsun
19th-century Norwegian novels
Modernist novels
Psychological novels
Novels set in Oslo
Novels about poverty
Norwegian novels adapted into films